Chatarpur block is one of the administrative community development block of Palamu district, Jharkhand state, India. This is one of the important block/Taluka from jharkhand situated at National Highway 98 (India)(old numbering). According to census (2001), the block has 27,271 households with aggregate population of 166,843. The block has 240 villages.

See also
 Palamu Loksabha constituency
 Jharkhand Legislative Assembly
 Jharkhand
 Palamu

References
Blocks of Palamu district

Community development blocks in Jharkhand
Community development blocks in Palamu district